The 2010 Daytona 500 was the first stock car race of the 2010 NASCAR Sprint Cup Series. The 52nd running of the Daytona 500, it was held on February 14, 2010, in Daytona Beach, Florida, at Daytona International Speedway, before a crowd of about 175,000 attendees. Earnhardt Ganassi Racing driver Jamie McMurray won the 208-lap race from the 13th position. Dale Earnhardt Jr. of Hendrick Motorsports finished in second, and Roush Fenway Racing's Greg Biffle was third.

That was final NASCAR start of 1997 400 mile race winner John Andretti before his death in 10 years later.

Mark Martin, the oldest pole position winner in event history at 51 years and 27 days, led the opening four laps before Kasey Kahne passed him on lap five. Martin retook the lead two laps later. The lead changed 52 times among a then record-breaking 21 different drivers over the course of the race, with Kevin Harvick leading the most laps (41). It was twice stopped because a large pothole developed between turns one and two, due to moisture, cold weather, and heavy cars scraping the tarmac surface as they ran low to the ground for better aerodynamic efficiency. Harvick led on the 206th lap, until McMurray passed for his first Daytona 500 victory, and the fourth of his career.

Because this was the first race of the season, McMurray led the Drivers' Championship with 195 points, followed by Earnhardt in second place who had 175 points and Biffle in third with 170 points. Clint Bowyer and Harvick were fourth and fifth with 165 and 155 points, respectively. In the Manufacturers' Championship, Chevrolet led with nine points, ahead of Ford in second place with six points. Toyota was in third with four points, and Dodge completed the top four with three points with thirty-five races left in the season.

Background 

The 2010 Daytona 500 was the 1st of the 36 stock car races in the 2010 NASCAR Sprint Cup Series, and the 52nd edition of the event. It was held on February 14, 2010, in Daytona Beach, Florida, at Daytona International Speedway, The layout used for the Daytona 500 is a four-turn,  superspeedway. Daytona's turns are banked at 31 degrees, and the front stretch—the location of the finish line—is banked at 18 degrees.

NASCAR founder Bill France Sr. conceived the Daytona 500, which was first held in 1959; it is the successor to shorter races held on beaches in Daytona Beach. The race has been the opening round of the NASCAR season since 1982, and from 1988, it is one of four events that require cars to run restrictor plates. The Daytona 500 offers the most prize money of any American auto race. Winning the race is considered equal to winning either the World Series, the Super Bowl or The Masters.

For the 2010 race, NASCAR announced that it would stop policing bump drafting after it responded to a growing resentment from its fan-base and drivers about the lack of on-track aggression and emotion. It came as the organization gradually controlled, and eventually banned, the practice of bump drafting outright at the 2009 AMP Energy 500. Also, NASCAR elected to retain the yellow-marked out-of-bounds line at the bottom of race tracks because drivers voiced their opposition to its removal. Furthermore, the size of the restrictor plates' four openings were increased to its largest size since the 1989 Daytona 500 of 63/64-inches for more horsepower. NASCAR's vice-president of competition Robin Pemberton said that the changes would give control back to the drivers, "'Boys, have at it' and have a good time." NASCAR later altered the green–white–checker finish rule so that a maximum of not one but three attempts to finish the race could be done if the race would otherwise end under caution.

The cost of doing so was not disclosed; the work was completed in mid-January 2010. An spokesperson for the track's owner and operator International Speedway Corporation said, "Whenever we have an incident that impacts any of our systems, we take that opportunity to more closely scrutinize it and look at it across the company. Whatever we learn in these analyses, we’ll look and see where it can be applied to other tracks. The challenge is each track is different in terms of banking and speed, so our primary focus right now was on Talladega and Daytona."

Practice and qualifier 

There were six practice sessions scheduled to take place before the February 14 race. The first two, on February 5, were due to last for 80 and 90 minutes, respectively. The next two, on February 10, ran for 90 and 50 minutes. The 60-minute fifth session, scheduled for February 12, was cancelled due to a steady day-long rain shower. The final session on February 13 lasted 85 minutes. In the first practice session on Friday, February 5, which was shortened to an hour because of a thunderstorm from Central Florida, Dale Earnhardt Jr. was fastest with a lap of 47.770 seconds, ahead of Hendrick Motorsports teammates Mark Martin and Jeff Gordon in second and third. Bill Elliott, Robby Gordon, Ryan Newman, Kurt Busch, David Reutimann, Kyle Busch, and Clint Bowyer made up positions four through ten. Eight drivers did not set a lap time on Friday, so NASCAR moved the second practice session to Saturday morning to provide them with some on-track running. With a time of 48.072 seconds, David Gilliland led the session, ahead of Jeff Fuller, Terry Cook, and Derrike Cope.

A total of 54 cars entered the qualifier on February 6 to attempt to qualify for one of the 43 starting slots in the Daytona 500 itself. Each driver ran two laps, and unlike most races during the season, the qualifying session determined the first two positions. The rest of the field would qualify later, through the 2010 Gatorade Duels. Qualifying was held a day earlier than in previous years to avoid a direct clash with Super Bowl XLIV after the National Football League moved that event forward one week. The rain-out on Friday gave drivers little on-track preparation. Martin took his first Daytona 500 pole position, and the 49th of his career, with a lap of 47.074 seconds. At 51 years and 27 days, he was oldest pole position winner in race history. Martin was joined on the grid's front row by Earnhardt. After qualifying, Martin said it was "really special" to begin the year on pole position, and felt Earnhardt would be a challenger for the win.

Matt Kenseth led the third practice session on February 10 with a 46.331-second lap, followed by Kyle Busch, Brian Vickers, Jeff Burton, Edwards, Bowyer, Kasey Kahne, Reutimann, Kevin Harvick, and Joey Logano. Bowyer's right-rear tire blew leaving turn two, and he slid sideways into an outside barrier. Reutimann was close by, and hit the rear of Bowyer's car. Reutimann's rear, in turn, was struck by Cope's slowing car. Marcos Ambrose led the fourth practice session later that day with a 46.535-second lap, with Kyle Busch, Reed Sorenson, Logano, Kahne, Kenseth, Paul Menard, Greg Biffle, Elliott Sadler, and Edwards following in the top ten. One of Vickers' tires failed exiting turn two three minutes later, and he spun through grass on the backstretch with minimal structural damage. Just after green flag running resumed, Mike Bliss oversteered on the left exiting the fourth turn, and rammed into Logano. As the rest of the field steered away, Johnson hit the back of Hamlin's car. Johnson stopped on pit road with an orange traffic cone lodged underneath his splitter. Michael Waltrip was hit by another car and went through grass. Due to the various crashes, Bowyer, Reutimann, Cope, Bliss, Johnson, and Logano would switch into their back-up cars for the Gatorade Duels.

Johnson and Kahne were the winners of the Gatorade Duels on February 11. The qualifying grid was finalized with Johnson in third and Kahne starting fourth. Harvick qualified in fifth, ahead of Tony Stewart in sixth. Kyle Busch, Juan Pablo Montoya, Bowyer, and Kurt Busch completed the top ten. The 11 drivers that failed to qualify were Casey Mears, Todd Bodine, Gilliland, Cook, Cope, Aric Almirola, Dave Blaney, Sorenson, Mike Wallace, Norm Benning, and Fuller. Jeff Gordon switched to a back-up car for the race after he was involved in a three-car accident. A. J. Allmendinger's engine compartment had smoke billowing from it, and his team changed engines after the session.

Qualifying results

Race 
Live television coverage of the race began in the United States at midday Eastern Standard Time (EST) (UTC−05:00) on Fox. Commentary was provided by lap-by-lap analyst Mike Joy, with analysis from three-time Cup Series champion Darrell Waltrip, and former crew chief Larry McReynolds. Around the start of the race, the weather was clear with the air temperature ; conditions were expected to remain consistent. David Uth, senior pastor of First Baptist Church of Orlando, began pre-race ceremonies with an inovcation. Singer and Grammy Award winner Harry Connick Jr. performed the national anthem, and Junior Johnson, former Daytona 500 champion and NASCAR Hall of Fame inductee, commanded the drivers to start their engines. During the pace laps, Gordon, Burton, and Waltrip moved to the rear of the field because they switched into a back-up car, and Allmendinger, and Edwards did the same for changing their engines.

The race began at 1:20 p.m EST, and was scheduled to last 200 laps. Johnson physically pushed Martin to allow his teammate to retain the lead into turn one. Harvick advanced to the third position, as the inside line was faster early on. The first 21 cars were two abreast by the third lap, with a second distinct pack of vehicles in a single line. On lap four, Kahne and those behind him caught Martin, but were unable to pass the latter, who kept the lead at the start-finish line. Stewart gave Kahne drafting aid to allow him to pass Martin for the lead on the next lap. On lap six, Martin retook first place on the outside line, and steered left to retain it. The first caution was given for a multi-car accident on lap seven; Brad Keselowski's right-rear tire failed, and he struck the turn-two wall, collecting Smith, Hornish, Bliss, Max Papis, and Boris Said, and littering debris on the track. Keselowski and Hornish entered their garages for repairs, and Smith retired. Most of the field made pit stops for tires and chassis adjustments. Martin led at the lap-12 restart, followed by his teammate Earnhardt, and Montoya. On the next lap, Montoya was pushed by Harvick, and passed Martin on the right for the lead.

Montoya held the lead for only one lap, however, as Earnhardt passed him on lap 14. Earnhardt then weaved to block drivers from overtaking him. On lap 17, Harvick unsuccessfully sought to claim the lead from Earnhardt into turn three. Harvick nonetheless took the lead on the left on the next lap; he received pushing assistance from Kahne and Sadler to keep it until they passed him for first and second on lap 22. On the next lap, Harvick returned to the lead as Kahne lost the draft and lost positions. By lap 26, Kurt Busch had moved to second place. Harvick, Kurt Busch, and Sadler led the field by 1.4 seconds by the 30th lap. Kurt Busch turned left but he failed to pass Harvick for the lead. Sadler overtook Kurt Busch for second on lap 34. Two laps later, Kurt Busch passed Sadler and Harvick to move into the lead. After starting at the rear of the grid, Allmendinger had advanced to second by the 38th lap. Green flag pit stops began on the next lap. On lap 45, Kurt Busch lost the lead as Allmendinger overtook him on the backstretch, but retook it from Allmendinger on the inside three laps later.

Kurt Busch and Allmendinger entered pit road on lap 50, handing the lead to Logano, held it until his own stop on the next lap. Robby Gordon led the 51st lap. After the pit stops, Kurt Busch returned to first with Allmendinger second and Johnson third. They pulled away from the rest of the field. On the 58th lap, Kyle Busch overtook Kahne for fifth place. Harvick was stranded on the left lane, and fell to sixth as Kyle Busch and Kahne passed him on the backstretch during lap 59. On lap 65 Joe Nemechek spun into the turn-four wall; Hornish avoided hitting him, but the second caution was called. The leaders made pit stops for tires and car adjustments. Kenseth stayed on the track to lead one lap until his own pit stop. Kurt Busch led at the lap-70 restart. On the next lap, Harvick helped Allmendinger retake the lead from Kurt Busch. Allmendinger turned left on lap 72, and Harvick overtook him to reclaim the lead. However, Allemdinger returned to the lead on lap 73 when cars on the left were faster than those on the right. Four laps later, Bliss spun on the backstretch, damaging his car's rear left, and triggering the third caution.

During the caution, the leaders made pit stops for fuel, tires and car adjustments. Allmendinger lost the lead since one of his crew members dropped a lug nut. Hamlin staggered his pit stop, allowing him to lead one lap. Kurt Busch reclaimed the lead, and led at the restart on lap 81, followed by Biffle and Kyle Busch. On lap 82, Biffle received drafting assistance from Kyle Busch to overtake Kurt Busch for first place to the inside. Kurt Busch responded by challenging Biffle between laps 83 and 84 but was unable to reclaim the lead. After starting towards the rear of the field, Gordon moved to third by the 86th lap. On lap 95, Kyle Busch passed Biffle on the outside for first place Soon after, Gordon passed Biffle for second. Gordon later turned onto the outside line to overtake Kyle Busch at the conclusion of lap 98. Two laps later, Bowyer steered right on the backstretch to pass Gordon for the lead.

Kyle Busch attempted to overtake Bowyer in turn two on lap 102 but could not successfully complete the pass. Gordon did the same four laps later; again, he was unable to take first position and dropped back. On the 107th lap, Biffle overtook Bowyer to claim the lead, but Bowyer retook it on the next lap. Biffle achieved a fast run on the left and retook the lead from Bowyer on lap 110. He held it for one lap as Bowyer overtook him to lead the 111th lap. After David Ragan found a draft on the right to move into second, he overtook Bowyer at the end of lap 113. Two laps later, Ragan lost the lead to Bowyer. John Andretti's tire cut, and he crashed into the turn-two wall on the 117th lap to bring out the fourth caution. Most of the leaders made pit stops for fuel, tires and car adjustments. Travis Kvapil and Boris Said each staggered their pit stops on laps 119 and 120, leading one lap each, before Bowyer returned to first place on the 121st lap.

All cars were ordered to park on pit road to allow track engineers to observe the damage. They patched the pothole with two compounds that, due to moisture and cold weather, did not hold; a third attempted allowed the race to continue. Drivers were recalled to their cars at 4:52 EST, and engines were restarted eight minutes later. Racing resumed under caution, and the pit road was reopened to drivers. Bowyer led from Ragan and Kahne on the inside lane at the lap-125 restart. Two laps later, Sadler pushed Kahne past Bowyer (who turned right) for the lead. Kahne then repelled Bowyer by turning right on lap 129, allowing Sadler to draw alongside him. Bowyer gained the lead on the next lap but Sadler overtook him before the start-finish line. On lap 131, Sadler lost the lead to Bowyer, but got beside him to retake the lead on the next lap.

Harvick made it three abreast on the backstretch during the 136th lap, putting Sadler in the middle of the track, and Bowyer returned to the lead. Two laps later, Harvick overtook his teammate Bowyer just before crossing the start-finish line. Gordon tried to overtake Bowyer for third on lap 141, but Kahne aided the latter in blocking the pass. On lap 142, fifth-placed Allmendinger lost control of his car in the fourth turn, narrowly avoided collecting Gordon, and spun into the backstretch. He avoided hitting a wall, and was stranded in the grass where his car caught fire, prompting the fifth caution. During the caution, most of the field made pit stops for tires and adjustments. Sadler had two tires installed on his car, and led at the 146 restart, followed by Martin Truex Jr. and Harvick. Two laps later, Truex received help from Harvick to pass Sadler to claim the lead. On lap 150, Sadler went to the outside and fell to tenth place after an unsuccessful challenge for the first position. Harvick got the lead back by overtaking Truex on the left on the next lap. On the 154th lap, Montoya took the lead for the second time until Harvick passed him to reclaim the lead.

A competition caution for teams to check their cars was necessitated on lap 159 because the pothole between turns one and two had re-emerged, larger than before. On lap 161, the race was stopped for a second time, and cars were again ordered to park on pit road for 44 minutes and 35 seconds. Workers collected polyester resin products from multiple teams, which was mixed with a hardener. They then heated the compound with blow torches and jet dryers to make the track safe to drive on. Drivers got back into their cars at 6:22 p.m. EST, and restarted their engines eight minutes later. The race restarted under caution conditions, as the leaders made pit stops for tires and car adjustments. Speed took the lead for the lap 168 restart. On the next lap, Biffle received drafting assistance from his teammates Ragan and Edwards on the outside lane to pass Speed for first place. On the 176th lap, Speed regained the lead from Biffle on the inside lane. He battled Biffle for the next seven laps until Biffle pulled clear on lap 184. On lap 188, Kurt Busch overtook Edwards for third place. The seventh caution came six laps later, when Sadler lost control of his car on the backstretch and struck the barrier, collecting Kvapil and Newman. On lap 198, Bowyer led Biffle and Truex at the restart.

Biffle passed Bowyer for first on the backstretch before an eighth caution was waved for an accident on lap 199: Elliott and Logano collided in the third turn, collecting Said. The race restarted with Biffle leading on lap 202 for a first attempt at a green–white–checker finish extending the race by two laps. On the next lap, just as Harvick took the lead from Biffle in turn two, the ninth caution was prompted as Kahne was hit by Gordon on the backstretch and slid up the track, collecting Robert Richardson Jr. and Labonte. The race restarted for a second green–white–checker finish on the 206th lap (taking the event to 208 laps), with Harvick leading Jamie McMurray. Edwards delayed Harvick, allowing McMurray to take the lead with help from Biffle on the right at turn three on lap 207. Earnhardt moved from tenth to second within 1½ laps, but could not challenge McMurray, who took his first Daytona 500 win, and the fourth of his career. Earnhardt finished second, Biffle third, Bowyer fourth and Reutimann fifth. Truex, Harvick, Kenseth, Edwards and Montoya completed the top ten. There were 52 lead changes among a then-race record of 21 drivers during the race. Harvick's 41 laps led was the most of any competitor. McMurray led once for a total of two laps.

Post-race comments 

McMurray appeared in Victory Lane after celebrating in the infield to commemorate his fourth career win in front of an estimated crowd of 175,000 people; the win earned him $1,508,449. He was emotional about his victory, saying, "I can’t really put it into words the way it feels. I’m trying to be genuine and as sincere as I can and not sound cliché: as a kid growing up, this is what you dream of, of being able to win the Daytona 500." Earnhardt stated his second-place finish validated the changes his team undertook, and was confident about his prospects over the coming races. He said of the on-track action, "I went wherever they weren’t, I don’t enjoy being that aggressive. If there was room for the radiator, you hold the gas down and go. They did a lot to put the racing back in the driver’s hands. There was a ton of bumping out there and I never felt like anyone was looking over my shoulder." Third-placed Biffle said he felt he made his move too soon on the first green–white–checker finish, "The restarts, I couldn’t get anybody to push me, I kept getting a run. I wish I waited until the backstretch to make my big run. I did it on the frontstretch. I gave Junior and all the guys too much of an opportunity to catch us.”

The race was the first since the 2004 Advance Auto Parts 500 at Martinsville Speedway to be affected by a deteriorating track. The pothole's reemergence was attributed to the cars' weight of  uprooting the surface patch, and enlarging the pothole to twice its original size. Daytona International Speedway president Robin Braig accepted responsibility for the track surface and apologized for it. He stated that no issues were discovered during a pre-race inspection, and that he believed cars running too low to the ground for better aerodynamic efficiency had caused the pothole. It was later determined that several factors combined to cause the pothole's formation: a week of heavy rain that flooded the track in May 2009, the pre-race downpour, below-average ground temperatures, and cars bottoming out and scraping the tarmac surface. The track was later repaved from July 5 to December 10, the first time it had been repaved since 1978.

Earnhardt said he was not satisfied with the revised green–white–checker finish rules because he was uncertain about the actions of drivers, but did not believe it was overdone, "I feel like the fans deserve probably more of a show, so that's what they got. The green-white-checkered was put into play to give us an opportunity to finish the race under green. Finishing under yellow is quite a melodramatic moment." Gordon reiterated an earlier view of his that only one attempt should be made, "I believe in doing things for the fans but I also think they have their limits. It wasn't going to give us a winning day by not having multiple green-white-checkers but it would have saved us a race car." Pemberton said the rule change confirmed that NASCAR had increased the amount of on-track action, and stressed that three attempts were made to finish the race, "I've seen great [Daytona 500s] that were a half-dozen cars duking it out, And this race right here, with the potential of the top 15 or 20 guys up there, in the last 25 miles, was incredible. A great race in my opinion though I've only watched 33 of 'em."

Because this was the first race of the season, McMurray led the Drivers' Championship with 195 points, followed by Earnhardt with 15 points less in second, and Biffle third. Bowyer stood in fourth and Harvick was fifth. Reutimann, Truex, Kenseth, Montoya, Edwards, Martin, and Burton rounded out the top twelve drivers. Chevrolet led the Manufacturers' Championship with nine points, three ahead of Ford in second. Toyota was third with four points, and Dodge in fourth had three points. The race attracted 13.294 million television viewers; excluding the two stoppages, it took three hours, 47 minutes and 16 seconds to complete, and the margin of victory was 0.119 seconds.

Race results

Standings after the race 

Drivers' Championship standings

Manufacturers' Championship standings

Note: Only the top twelve positions are included for the driver standings.

Notes and references

Notes

References 

Daytona 500
Daytona 500
NASCAR races at Daytona International Speedway
February 2010 sports events in the United States